East Finchley is an area in North London, immediately north of Hampstead Heath. Like neighbouring Muswell Hill it straddles the London Boroughs of Barnet and Haringey, with most of East Finchley falling into the London Borough of Barnet. It has the greenest high road in London.

Geographically, it is separated from the rest of Finchley by the North Circular, with North Finchley and West Finchley to the north, and Finchley Central (Church End) to the northwest.

East Finchley (East End) was first mentioned in 1365 when it formed a scattered hamlet, but by 1860 it was the most populous part of Finchley. Badly bombed during World War 2, and with the subsequent re-building, the street pattern of the Old Village was destroyed. However, the area retains a strong community feeling.

The area collectively named Finchley, which included East Finchley (East End), Finchley Central (Church End) and North Finchley, was a parish until its incorporation into the ancient county of Middlesex in 1878; Finchley was incorporated into Greater London in 1965. 
Although most of East Finchley falls into the parliamentary constituency of Finchley and Golders Green, East Finchley is a village in its own right and not considered to be part of the town of Finchley.

History 

The land on which most of East Finchley now stands was once part of the Bishop of London's hunting ground, to the south of Finchley Common, first recorded around 1400. The Bishop of London built a road through his land, named The Bishop's Avenue, which still exists today. Another road extended further north, weaving through what is now Market Place, The Walks, King Street, and Oak Lane. As a result, pubs such as The Old White Lion, The Bald Faced Stag, and The Five Bells (on East End Road), all of which survive today, sprang up to provide rest for the people using the road.

The area of "East Finchley Old Village" around Church Lane was west of the common and Bulls Lane (now Church Lane) dates back to at least the 17th century. With the coming of the Great Northern Railway in 1868, the area began to emerge, and the property was built gradually between the 1870s and the 1930s. However, it was not until 1914 that a more recognisable East Finchley High Road and surrounding area was visible.

Governance 
From around 1547 Finchley had a parish vestry, which became a local board in 1878, an urban district council in 1895, and finally a municipal borough council between 1933 and 1965. The area is now part of the London Borough of Barnet.

From 1959 to 1992 the Finchley constituency was represented in Parliament by Margaret Thatcher, UK Prime Minister from 1979 to 1990. Finchley is now included in the new constituency of Finchley and Golders Green, currently represented by a Conservative Member of Parliament. East Finchley ward is represented on Barnet Council by three elected Labour Councillors.

Transport 

East Finchley Underground station is marked by a well-known statue of an archer by Eric Aumonier in the Art Deco style. For many years this was the longest tunnel in the world. There was originally an arrow at Morden Station to match the archer at East Finchley, but this was stolen a few months after the station was opened.

The station is on the High Barnet branch of the Northern line which serves the city (via Bank) and the west end (via Charing Cross) with trains every 2–3 minutes. Buses also serve the high street with the 263 route going from Barnet Hospital to Highbury Barn; the 143 bus linking East Finchley to Archway, London and Brent Cross; the 102 from Edmonton Green, the 234 serving Barnet, The Spires from Highgate Wood and the 603 running between Swiss Cottage and Muswell Hill.

Housing 

Housing in East Finchley is diverse in its nature, encompassing many housing styles, from 19th-century terraced housing, large 30s houses, and multimillion-pound mansions on The Bishop's Avenue. The three eleven-storey tower blocks of Prospect Ring & Norfolk Close are visible for miles around. A further even taller towerblock in Prospect Ring was completed in 2021 .

Schools 
Only one state primary school, Martin Primary School (Ofsted outstanding) is situated in East Finchley itself, but the east and southern parts of N2 are covered by the catchment of Tetherdown, Coldfall and Highgate Primary Schools (all within the London Borough of Haringey). Pupils on the west side of the village attend Brookland Infant and Junior Schools which adjoin Christ's College. There are two faith primary schools - Holy Trinity (CofE) and Eden Primary School (Jewish).

East Finchley is home to two mixed non-selective non-denominational secondary schools - Archer Academy (opened 2013) and Christ's College (mixed, as of 2018) and a mixed Roman Catholic secondary school - Bishop Douglass Catholic School. Pupils on the east (Muswell Hill) side of the village also attend Fortismere School (mixed comprehensive, which falls under the London Borough of Haringey Local Education Authority).

Demography

<noinclude>
According to the 2011 UK Census, 72% of the ward's population was White (52% White British, 4% Irish, 16% Other White), 10% Asian British (5% Indian, 1% Pakistani, 1% Chinese, 3% Other Asian), 7% Black British (5% African, 1% Caribbean, 1% Other Black); the remaining population consists of mixed ethnic groups (2.0% White and Black African/Caribbean, 1.9% White and Asian, 1.7% Other Mixed), Arab and others .

The largest religion was Christianity, claimed by 41% of the population, followed by Judaism and Islam claimed by 9% and 7% of the population respectively. Of the population, 36% either stated they had no religion (27%) or did not state their religion (9%).

The Ismaili Muslim community, headed by the Aga Khan, worship at a Jamatkhana opened in 1996, which had been built in harmony with the neighbourhood as per the aims of this community. It is located behind the site of the Congregational Church that had been demolished in 1965 to make way for the shops of Viceroy Parade.

Amenities and features 

The independent Phoenix Cinema (once called the Rex and before that the Coliseum) is located on the High Road, and regularly shows films with more individual appeal than is the case with the cinema chains. It is the oldest purpose-built cinema in the UK (the only older ones having started life as theatres). Time Out, the arts magazine, describes the Phoenix as the best single-screen cinema in London. Film critic Mark Kermode has written that the Phoenix Cinema "remains the single most significant cinema in my development as a bona fide cinema obsessive."

There is a listed Neo-Georgian public library located on the High Road opposite Leslie Road. Behind the library are some award-winning allotments, owned by Barnet Council. Adjacent to these are the Fuelland allotments which are held in trust. The massive St. Pancras and Islington Cemetery is located on the High Road. Established in 1854, it is the oldest municipal cemetery in London and the largest. The Victorian painter Ford Madox Brown is buried there.

Opposite East Finchley tube station is Cherry Tree Wood, approx. 4.5 ha in size, and contains both woodland and grassland. Nearby parks include Coldfall Wood to the north, and Highgate Wood, Queens Wood, and Hampstead Heath to the south.  Also close to the tube station is the head office of McDonald's UK; this is seen by the flags and logos on the building.

Media 
The Archer, founded in 1993, is East Finchley's free monthly community newspaper, run by volunteers. It takes its name from the eponymous statue at East Finchley tube station.

Literary references 
In Evelyn Waugh's satirical novel Scoop, Lord Copper, owner of the newspaper Daily Beast, lived in East Finchley. "That evening, Mr Salter, foreign editor of The Beast, was summoned to dinner at his chief's country seat at East Finchley."

Notable people 
 Peter Sellers lived with his mother at 211b High Road, and in his Goon Show persona as Bluebottle was usually referred to as an East Finchley Boy Scout. 
 Singer George Michael was born in Church Lane.
Ronald Fisher was born in East Finchley.
 Gracie Fields lived in The Bishop's Avenue.
 Thomas Pierrepoint, the official British hangman in the early 1900s, lived in Huntingdon Road, by chance not far where the 18th-century gibbet had stood in Lincoln Road.
 The poet, playwright, and educator Clive Sansom was born in East Finchley in 1910.
 Jerry Springer grew up in East Finchley before moving to the United States.
 Ray and Dave Davies, founders of the English rock band The Kinks, were born on Huntingdon Road, later lived in Denmark Terrace, and played their first gigs in The Clissold Arms, N2.
 Hugo Lloris lives in East Finchley.
Amy Winehouse lived in East Finchley.
John 'Hutch' Hutchinson lived in East Finchley.
Will Self grew up between East Finchley and Hampstead Garden Suburb.
Amelia Sach and Annie Walters lived and committed their crimes in East Finchley.
Noreena Hertz was born in East Finchley.

See also 
 The Bishops Avenue
 Hampstead Garden Suburb
 Highgate

References 

Areas of London
Districts of the London Borough of Barnet
District centres of London
Finchley